P. K. Dave may also refer to:
 P. K. Dave, Indian orthopedic surgeon
 P. K. Dave (lieutenant governor) (1 January 1923 – 19 September 2006), lieutenant Governor of Delhi

Indian masculine given names